Romaric Kondzy (frère de styvel Faudey-massembo) (born 12 December 1980) is a Congolese basketball player who is a member of the Congo national basketball team.  

Kondzy currently plays for InterClub Brazzaville of the Congo Basketball League.  He was a member of the Congo national basketball team that finished sixteenth at the 2009 FIBA Africa Championship and finished third in the competition in steals, averaging 2.3 SPG.

References

1980 births
Living people
Republic of the Congo men's basketball players